East Maizuru Senior High School, is a public high school in Jisengenji, Maizuru, Kyoto Prefecture. There is also an extension campus, generally for part-time study.

History 
The Kyoto Prefectural East Maizuru Junior High School and Kyoto Prefectural East Maizuru Girls Senior High School opened in April 1940. In June 1943, the two schools were renamed Kyoto Prefectural Maizuru Second Junior High School and Kyoto Prefectural Maizuru Girls Second Senior High School, respectively. Under an educational system reform in  1948, the schools then became Kyoto Prefectural East Maizuru Senior High School and Kyoto Prefectural East Maizuru Girls Senior High School and in the following December, the two were combined into East Maizuru Senior High School.

Notable alumni 
 Hideaki Nitani (Actor)
 Tasyua Ishihara (Director, Kyoto Animation )

See also 
 List of high schools in Japan

External links 
 East Maizuru High School Official Website
 Extension campuses

High schools in Kyoto Prefecture
Educational institutions established in 1940
1940 establishments in Japan